Lonnie Cameron (born July 15, 1964) is a Canadian retired National Hockey League linesman, who wears uniform number #74. He has worked more than 1500 NHL games including the NHL All-Star Game and the Stanley Cup Playoffs. He was selected to work games in the men's ice hockey tournament at the 2014 Winter Olympics in Sochi.

References

1964 births
Living people
National Hockey League officials
Canadian ice hockey officials